Ian Renard  was the 19th Chancellor of the University of Melbourne, from February 2005 to January 2009. He holds a Master of Laws from the university, is an alumnus of Ormond College, along with being a former President of the Melbourne University Liberal Club from 1966 to 1968. Renard is a former partner of major Australian law firm Allens Arthur Robinson. He was the chairman of the Melbourne Theatre Company.  Ian Renard is the chairman of the RE Ross Trust.

References 

Year of birth missing (living people)
Living people
Chancellors of the University of Melbourne
Melbourne Law School alumni
People educated at Scotch College, Melbourne
Members of the Order of Australia